Christophe Roger-Vasselin (born 8 July 1957) is a French former professional tennis player.

Roger-Vasselin won two doubles titles during his professional career. Notably in his singles career, he reached the French Open semifinals in 1983, beating No. 1 seed Jimmy Connors in the quarterfinals, but lost to eventual champion Yannick Noah.  The right-hander reached his highest singles ATP ranking on 20 June 1983, when he became world No. 29.

In the autumn of 1977 he briefly played with a double-strung racket, the so-called spaghetti racket, with which he reached the final of the Porée Cup in Paris. The racket was banned shortly afterwards.

His son Édouard Roger-Vasselin followed him into the profession and is currently active on the ATP Tour, and went on to win the French Open in doubles in 2014.

Career finals

Singles (2 losses)

Doubles (2 wins)

References

External links
 
 
 

1957 births
Living people
French male tennis players
French Open junior champions
Tennis people from Greater London
Grand Slam (tennis) champions in boys' singles